Franck Reynier (born 20 October 1965 in Montélimar, Drôme) was a member of the National Assembly of France. He represented Drôme's 2nd constituency, and has been the vice president of the Radical Party since 2007.

He lost his seat to Alice Thourot of En Marche in the 2017 French legislative election.

References

1965 births
Living people
People from Montélimar
Radical Party (France) politicians
Union for a Popular Movement politicians
Deputies of the 13th National Assembly of the French Fifth Republic
Deputies of the 14th National Assembly of the French Fifth Republic
Union of Democrats and Independents politicians

21st-century French politicians